Elachista enitescens is a moth of the family Elachistidae. It is found in the United States, where it has been recorded from Ohio and Maine.

The wingspan is 7–8 mm. The base of forewings is leaden metallic, with a reddish and purplish luster. The remaining area of the forewings is dark brown. There is an oblique silvery or golden metallic fascia with reddish and purplish luster before the middle of the wing. The hindwings are dark brown. Adults have been recorded on wing from April to August.

The larvae feed on Scirpus atrovirens. They mine the leaves of their host plant. Mining larvae can be found in March and early April. Later, the larvae enter a new leaf at the base. This mine extends from the base of the leaf upward. The larvae are yellow with a pair of dark patches.

References

enitescens
Moths described in 1921
Moths of North America